Jane Robinson is a costume designer.

Robinson has received three Emmy awards: an Outstanding Costumes for a Series award for Jennie: Lady Randolph Churchill (1976) and two Outstanding Costumes for a Miniseries, Movie, or Special awards for Anastasia (1987) and Poor Little Rich Girl: The Barbara Hutton Story (1988). She has also received a British Academy of Film and Television Arts (BAFTA) Television Craft award for Costume Design and an Emmy nomination for her work in Brideshead Revisited (1982)n.

Robinson was nominated for an Academy Award for Best Costume Design for her work on A Handful of Dust (1988).

References

External links

British costume designers
Women costume designers
Living people
Date of birth missing (living people)
Primetime Emmy Award winners
BAFTA winners (people)
Year of birth missing (living people)